Melissa Kasri (born ) is an Algerian female volleyball player. She was part of the Algeria women's national volleyball team.

She participated in the 2015 FIVB Volleyball World Grand Prix.
On club level she played for NCB in 2015.

References

External links
 Profile at FIVB.org

1998 births
Living people
Algerian women's volleyball players
Place of birth missing (living people)
Opposite hitters
21st-century Algerian people